Domenico Mondo (1734 in Capodrise near Caserta – 1806 in Naples) was an Italian painter, active in both a late Baroque  and Neoclassical styles.

Biography
He studied under Francesco Solimena. Mondo became director of the Neapolitan Royal Academy of Fine Arts from 1789–1805. He was the author of an altarpiece at Sant'Aspreno ai Vergini in Naples, and frescoes in the Royal Palace of Caserta in 1785, like the Le Armi di Casa Borbone sostenute dalle virtù, in the Alabardieri room. He also painted for the parish churches of Sant'Andrea Apostolo and of the Immaculate Conception of Capodrise; and for the church of Ave Gratia Plena in Marcianise. In the palace of Caserta, he painted decorations for the Hall of the Alabardieri, a job for which he was chosen by Luigi Vanvitelli.

References

1734 births
1806 deaths
18th-century Italian painters
Italian male painters
19th-century Italian painters
Painters from Naples
19th-century Italian male artists
18th-century Italian male artists